The Reisinger national bridge championship is held at the fall American Contract Bridge League (ACBL) North American Bridge Championship (NABC).

The Reisinger is a board-a-match event.

History

The event is contested for the Reisinger Trophy (the Chicago Trophy until 1965). It is a six-session open team-of-four event scored by board-a-match with two qualifying sessions, two semifinal sessions and two final sessions. It was contested as a four-session championship until 1966.

The event began in 1929 as the North American Open Team Championship and the prize was the Chicago Trophy, donated by the Auction Bridge Club of Chicago. (In 1928, the open team competition was for the Harold S. Vanderbilt Cup.)

The Chicago Trophy was replaced in 1965 by the Reisinger Memorial Trophy, donated by the Greater New York Bridge Association in memory of Curt H. Reisinger. Reisinger (1891–1964), from New York City, was a principal patron of contract bridge and the American Contract Bridge League in the early years of both; he was a great-grandson of Anheuser and a grandson of Busch, co-founders of the brewery from which he inherited great wealth. That wealth enabled him to become a stalwart financial supporter of the game, as well as a noted philanthropist on a larger scale.

Winners

Board-a-match scoring generates many ties in the standings for each session and several ties after three days play. The Vanderbilt Cup was inaugurated one year before the Chicago Trophy and contested at board-a-match scoring that year, with a tie result. As the Chicago or the Reisinger since then (see table), there have been six ties for first place including a 3-way tie in 1947 and a 4-way in 1984.

Numerous champion teams have defended their titles successfully without change in personnel (intact). The four-person 1937 and 1938 champions added B. Jay Becker in 1939 and won again; one foursome including Becker won in 1942 and 1943, another won in 1953 and 1954—and 1956. For the Reisinger Trophy since 1966, there have been intact repeats in 1975, 1979 with a tie, 1994–95, 1999, 2005, 2011, and 2013. The one intact three-year winner, from 1993 to 1995, was Nick Nickell's professional team: Nickell, Richard Freeman, Bob Hamman, Bobby Wolff, Jeff Meckstroth, Eric Rodwell. It also won four Spingolds from 1993 to 1996 intact (another unique string) and the 1995 world championship Bermuda Bowl representing the United States. After one personnel change, Nickell was a double winner again in 2004–05, and a winner in 2008–09 across one change owing to death.

See also
Spingold Knockout Teams
Vanderbilt Knockout Teams

References

Sources

 List of previous winners, Pages 10–11. 

 2008 winners, Page 1. 

 "Search Results: Reisinger BAM Teams". ACBL. Visit "NABC Winners"; select a Fall NABC. Retrieved 2014-06-05.

External links
 "Reisinger – A Look Back". December 5, 2013. ACBL. Retrieved 2014-06-06.

North American Bridge Championships